The Dance of Fortune (Spanish: La Danza de la fortuna) is a 1944 Argentine musical comedy film directed by Luis Bayón Herrera and starring Luis Sandrini, Olinda Bozán and Héctor Quintanilla.

Cast
 Luis Sandrini
 Olinda Bozán
 Héctor Quintanilla
 Ana Gryn
 Lolita Torres	
 Luisa de García León

References

External links
 

1944 films
1944 musical comedy films
1940s Spanish-language films
Argentine black-and-white films
Argentine musical comedy films
Films directed by Luis Bayón Herrera
1940s Argentine films